Welgelegen is a resort in Suriname, located in the Coronie District.  Its population at the 2012 census was 593. Welgelegen started as a cotton plantation in 1824. The church of Welgelegen was consecrated on 1 November 1883, but wasn't built at the spot. It was first erected on Cardross Park, and later moved to its current location. The church is no longer in service.

The villages of Jenny and Mary's Hope are also located in the Welgelegen resort.

Peruvia Nature Reserve
The Peruvia Nature Reserve was founded in 1986. It is located near the mouth of the Coppename River, and covers an area of 31,000 hectares. The reserve contains moriche palms, Sandbox tree forests, and is home to the Blue-and-yellow macaw.

References

External links
 Coronie.nl

Resorts of Suriname
Populated places in Coronie District